In algebra, a semiprimitive ring or Jacobson semisimple ring or J-semisimple ring is a ring whose Jacobson radical is zero. This is a type of ring more general than a semisimple ring, but where simple modules still provide enough information about the ring.  Rings such as the ring of integers are semiprimitive, and an artinian semiprimitive ring is just a semisimple ring.  Semiprimitive rings can be understood as subdirect products of primitive rings, which are described by the Jacobson density theorem.

Definition
A ring is called semiprimitive or Jacobson semisimple if its Jacobson radical is the zero ideal.

A ring is semiprimitive if and only if it has a faithful semisimple left module.  The semiprimitive property is left-right symmetric, and so a ring is semiprimitive if and only if it has a faithful semisimple right module.

A ring is semiprimitive if and only if it is a subdirect product of left primitive rings.

A commutative ring is semiprimitive if and only if it is a subdirect product of fields, .

A left artinian ring is semiprimitive if and only if it is semisimple, . Such rings are sometimes called semisimple Artinian, .

Examples

 The ring of integers is semiprimitive, but not semisimple.
 Every primitive ring is semiprimitive.
 The product of two fields is semiprimitive but not primitive.
 Every von Neumann regular ring is semiprimitive.

Jacobson himself has defined a ring to be "semisimple" if and only if it is a subdirect product of simple rings, .  However, this is a stricter notion, since the endomorphism ring of a countably infinite dimensional vector space is semiprimitive, but not a subdirect product of simple rings, .

References

 

Algebraic structures
Ring theory